West Sunbury is a borough in Butler County, Pennsylvania, United States. The population was 192 at the 2010 census.

Geography
West Sunbury is located in north-central Butler County at  (41.006153, -79.896107). Pennsylvania Routes 138 and 308 run together through the center of the borough as Main Street.

Demographics

As of the census of 2000, there were 104 people, 42 households, and 25 families residing in the borough. The population density was 1,021.8 people per square mile (401.5/km2). There were 47 housing units at an average density of 461.8 per square mile (181.5/km2). The racial makeup of the borough was 100.00% White. Hispanic or Latino of any race were 1.92% of the population.

There were 42 households, out of which 33.3% had children under the age of 18 living with them, 47.6% were married couples living together, 14.3% had a female householder with no husband present, and 38.1% were non-families. 31.0% of all households were made up of individuals, and 14.3% had someone living alone who was 65 years of age or older. The average household size was 2.48 and the average family size was 3.19.

In the borough the population was spread out, with 26.9% under the age of 18, 7.7% from 18 to 24, 27.9% from 25 to 44, 22.1% from 45 to 64, and 15.4% who were 65 years of age or older. The median age was 36 years. For every 100 females there were 116.7 males. For every 100 females age 18 and over, there were 76.7 males.

The median income for a household in the borough was $25,625, and the median income for a family was $33,750. Males had a median income of $27,000 versus $15,750 for females. The per capita income for the borough was $12,643. There were 14.8% of families and 21.3% of the population living below the poverty line, including 32.1% of under eighteens and 12.5% of those over 64.

Schools 

Students in the borough and surrounding region belong to the Moniteau School District  Children in kindergarten through sixth grade receive education at the only elementary school, Dassa McKinney, located east of borough.  Students continue their education at Moniteau Jr./Sr. High School, located to the north of borough.

Notable people
Janet Anderson, 1982 U.S. Women's Open golf champion
Bob Glenn, baseball player and civil engineer
Brice Schwab, American football player
Maura Kimmel, PA state champion discus thrower

References

External links
 Moniteau High School

Populated places established in 1828
Boroughs in Butler County, Pennsylvania